The women's 10 metre platform is part of the Diving at the 2022 Commonwealth Games program. The competition will be held on 4 August 2022 at Sandwell Aquatics Centre in Birmingham.

Format
The competition will be held in two rounds:
 Preliminary round: All divers perform five dives; the top 12 divers advance to the final.
 Final: The 12 divers perform five dives; the preliminary round scores are erased and the top three divers win the gold, silver and bronze medals accordingly.

Schedule
All times are British Summmer Time (UTC+1).

Results

Green denotes finalists

References

Diving at the 2022 Commonwealth Games